Zeitschrift für Kristallographie – Crystalline Materials is a monthly peer-reviewed scientific journal published in English. The journal publishes theoretical and experimental studies in crystallography of both organic and inorganic substances. The journal was founded in 1877 under the title Zeitschrift für Krystallographie und Mineralogie by crystallographer and mineralogist Paul Heinrich von Groth, who served as the editor for 44 years. It has used several titles over its history, with the present title having been adopted in 2010. The journal is indexed in a variety of databases and has a 2020 impact factor of 1.616.

History 
The journal was established in 1877 by Paul von Groth as a German-language publication under the title Zeitschrift für Krystallographie und Mineralogie, and he served as its editor until the end of 1920.  Groth was appointed as the inaugural Professor of Mineralogy at the University of Strasbourg in 1872 and made great contributions to the disciplines of mineralogy and crystallography both there and, from 1883, as the curator at the Deutsches Museum in Munich.  Groth was the first to classify minerals according to their chemical composition and contributed to the understanding of isomorphism and morphotropy in crystalline systems.  Using the data from 55 volumes of the journal covering 39 years of publications (1877–1915) plus other sources, Groth produced the five volume work Chemische Krystallographie between 1906 and 1919.  This work catalogued the chemical and physical properties of the between 9,000 and 10,000 crystalline substances known at the time.

It has used a series of names over its history (see table below), finally becoming Zeitschrift für Kristallographie – Crystalline Materials in 2010, a name distinguishing it from the 1987 spin-off journal Zeitschrift für Kristallographie – New Crystal Structures.

Special issues 
Beginning in December 2002, the journal has produced special issues with articles grouped around a single theme.  Topics covered include the analysis of complex materials using pair distribution function methods, borates (double issue), hydrogen storage, in situ crystallisation, mathematical crystallography, mineral structures, nanocrystallography,  phononic crystals, photocrystallography, the application of precession electron diffraction methods, twinned crystals, and zeolites (double issue).  On four occasions, one or two issues of the journal have been dedicated to the memory of a crystallographer or mineralogist, usually with a theme associated with the individual's work and a description of their contribution to the field. These are summarised in the table below:

Abstracting and indexing 
The journal is abstracted and indexed in:
Chemical Abstracts Service
Current Contents/Physical, Chemical and Earth Sciences
EBSCO databases
Inspec
Science Citation Index Expanded
Scopus

According to the Journal Citation Reports, the journal has a 2015 impact factor of 2.560, and it is ranked 8th amongst the 26 crystallography journals.

References

External links 
 

Chemistry journals
Crystallography journals
Monthly journals
Publications established in 1877
Multilingual journals
De Gruyter academic journals
1877 establishments in Germany